The following lists events that happened during 2014 in Zimbabwe.

Incumbents

 President: Robert Mugabe 
 First Vice President: Joice Mujuru (until 8 December), Emmerson Mnangagwa (starting 12 December)
 Second Vice President: Phelekezela Mphoko (starting 12 December)

Events

January

 January 20 - President Robert Mugabe of Zimbabwe makes his first public appearance in several weeks.

February

 February 18 - Former United States congressman Melvin Jay Reynolds is arrested in Zimbabwe for possession of pornography.

May

 May 12 - Sharon Pincott gave up her 13 year battle monitoring, recording and helping to protect Zimbabwe's flagship herd of elephants which bear the President's identity, after land grabs in Presidential Elephant areas in Hwange, unethical practices and heightened attempts at intimidation became overwhelming.

November

 November 21 - A stampede in Kwekwe caused by the police firing tear gas kills at least eleven people and injures 40 others.

December

 18 December - Zimbabwean Bond Coins for 1 Cent, 5, 10, and 25 Cents were released into circulation in an attempt to ease the shortage of small change.

References

 
Years of the 21st century in Zimbabwe
2010s in Zimbabwe
Zimbabwe
Zimbabwe